Mohamed Abdullah Mohamed Maharoof (born 25 April 1957; also known as Sinna Maharoof) is a Sri Lankan politician and Member of Parliament.

Early life
Maharoof was born on 25 April 1957. He is a cousin of Imran Maharoof, Member of Parliament.

Career
Maharoof contested the 2000 parliamentary election as one of the United National Party's (UNP) candidates in Trincomalee District. He was elected and entered Parliament. He was re-elected at the 2001 parliamentary election as a United National Front (UNF) candidate. He contested the 2004 parliamentary election as a Sri Lanka Muslim Congress (SLMC) candidate but failed to get re-elected after coming fourth amongst the SLMC candidates.

Maharoof contested the 2008 provincial council election as one of the UNF's candidates in Trincomalee District and was elected to the Eastern Provincial Council. He contested the 2012 provincial council election as a UNP candidate but failed to get re-elected after coming second amongst the UNP candidates.

Maharoof was one of the United National Front for Good Governance's candidates in Trincomalee District at the 2015 parliamentary election. He was elected and entered Parliament.

Electoral history

References

1957 births
All Ceylon Makkal Congress politicians
Living people
Members of the 11th Parliament of Sri Lanka
Members of the 12th Parliament of Sri Lanka
Members of the 15th Parliament of Sri Lanka
Members of the Eastern Provincial Council
People from Eastern Province, Sri Lanka
Sri Lankan Moor politicians
Sri Lanka Muslim Congress politicians
Sri Lankan Muslims
United National Party politicians